Charhi railway station is a station on the Koderma–Hazaribagh–Barkakana line in Churchu (community development block), Hazaribagh district, Jharkhand serving Charhi and nearby areas.

Charhi railway station is located at an altitude of 453 m above mean sea level. Hazaribagh Town is 27 km and Barkakana is 30 km from Charhi.

As of 2019, the Koderma–Hazaribagh–Barkakana Passenger stops four times daily at this station (two each way – UP and DOWN).

While the 80 km long Koderma–Hazaribagh line was commissioned in 2015, the 57-km long Hazaribagh–Barkakana section was opened in 2016. Work is in progress on the Barkakana–Ranchi sector. The state government is bearing half of the project cost. As the line passes through a coal mining belt it will carry a lot of coal, in addition to passenger traffic.

References 

Railway stations in Hazaribagh district